Taylor Fritz defeated Frances Tiafoe in the final, 7–6(7–3), 7–6(7–2) to win the singles tennis title at the 2022 Japan Open.

Novak Djokovic was the reigning champion from when the event was last held in 2019, but chose to compete in Astana instead.

Seeds

Draw

Finals

Top half

Bottom half

Qualifying

Seeds

Qualifiers

Lucky loser 
  Hiroki Moriya

Qualifying draw

First qualifier

Second qualifier

Third qualifier

Fourth qualifier

References

External links
Main draw
Qualifying draw

Singles